Samuel Moss Solomon (c. 1769 – 13 May 1842) was an early Jewish settler in Australia, amongst whose descendants many achieved a degree of notability. The relationship between these descendants is complicated by three factors: the duplication of names, not only within a family line but across lines; the number of intra-family marriages; and marriages to people with the same surname but not closely related. This list is not exhaustive but includes most family members likely to be found in Wikipedia and Australian newspapers.

History
Samuel Moss Solomon had a business in London manufacturing pencils, though reports of him being an inventor or even a major manufacturer are unsupportable. He married Elizabeth Moses (c. 1772–c. 1814) and had four sons: Moss Samuel, Emanuel, Vaiben and Phillip, and four daughters: Susan, Hannah, Sarah and Esther. After the death of Elizabeth he married Esther Davis (31 December 1774 – 13 July 1875), with whom he had another two children, Isaac and Elizabeth "Betsy". Their home was at 30 Wentworth Street, Spitalfields, London.

Two sons, Vaiben and Emanuel, fell foul of the law, and were transported to Sydney in 1818 on the Lady Castlereagh as convicts. Fifteen years later Samuel Moss Solomon and his wife Esther and many of their family emigrated to Australia in the Enchantress, arriving in Sydney on 24 April 1833. Sons Moss Samuel Solomon and Isaac Solomon emigrated, also several children of Susan Benjamin, née Solomon, and later Susan herself. Hannah (1801 – 1 September 1849), Sarah (1806 – 14 March 1893) and Phillip (1806 – September 1876) were married and remained in England.

Samuel Moss Solomon died in Sydney in 1842. Ten years after the death of her husband, Esther moved to the home of her son Isaac in Adelaide, where she died some 23 years later.

Family
Samuel Moss Solomon (c. 1769 – 13 May 1842 in Sydney) married Elizabeth Moses (c. 1772–c. 1814). She was the mother of Moss Samuel (1796 – 3? 4? February 1849), Susan (1799 – 14 June 1885), Emanuel (1800 – 3 October 1873), Hannah (1801 – 1 September 1849), Vaiben (1802 – 21 June 1860), Phillip (1806 – September 1876), Sarah (c. 1808 – 14 March 1893), and Esther (1809 – 3 December 1869).

He married again, to Esther Davis (31 December 1774 – 13 July 1875), with whom he had another two children: Isaac (5 April 1816 – 27 July 1901) and Elizabeth "Betsy" (14 June 1821 – 9 February 1898). He is reported as emigrating to Sydney with daughters Hannah and Elizabeth in April 1833. Ten years after the death of her husband, Esther moved to the home of her son Isaac in Adelaide, where she died some 23 years later.

Moss Samuel
Moss Samuel Solomon (1796 – 3? 4? February 1849) married Elizabeth "Betsy" Myers or Meyers (c. 1799–c. 1825). Second marriage to Leah Myers (1807 – 4 January 1871 in Adelaide) c. 1830
Judah Moss Solomon (21 December 1818 – 29 August 1880) married cousin Rachel Cohen (1819 – 9 January 1864) on 7 August 1842. She was a daughter of Benjamin Samuel Cohen (1791–1858) of London (see Hannah Solomon below). He married again on 4 September 1867 to  Adela Pulver (c. 1844 – 21 September 1875), daughter of Rev. Isaac Pulver (c. 1802–1873) of Hobart. She had two children by him: Elias in 1870 and Rosetta on 8 September 1871, who may not have lived. He was the MP for Adelaide 1858–1860, MLC 1861–1866, mayor of Adelaide 1869–1871,  and MP for West Adelaide 1871–1875.
Moss Judah Solomon (15 June 1843 – 11 February 1933) was born in Moreton Bay, Queensland, had residence "Palmerston" 226 Wellington Square North Adelaide. He married a second time, to Fanny Bennett (daughter of Gabriel Bennett, she founded the Jewish Ladies' Guild in 1902, died in 1927) in 1895. He was partner in firm of Solomon Cousins (aka Nimble Ninepence) of King William Street and Kapunda with his "uncle" Joseph Samuel Solomon (1846–1940). His children included:
Rachel Adelaide "Rae" Solomon (9 September 1866 – 6 July 1945) married Edgar L. Lawrence (c. 1865 – 24 May 1933) on 28 October 1891. Edgar was Perth manager for W.D. & H.O. Wills and son of L. P. Lawrence.
Susan Selina "Susie" Solomon (10 February 1868 – 10 December 1963) graduated BSc in 1890
J(udah) Moss Solomon BA LLB (12 April 1869 – 30 March 1949) married Elizabeth Sarah "Beth" or "Lizzie" Barnard (1875 – 2 January 1943) on 24 June 1896. He was a trooper with the 2nd NSW Mounted Rifles, served in the Boer War, was awarded the Queen's South Africa Medal. He was Hon. sec. of Lady Kintore Cottages, and solicitor of King William Street, Adelaide from 1893 to 1901.
Around 1907 Solomon moved to Subiaco, Western Australia, with a home "Braemar" at Hammersley Road. He was foundation member and first secretary of Kitchener Park Bowls Club, struck off legal rolls for dishonest conduct, returned to Adelaide? c. February 1914, then in Sydney as managing clerk for lawyer Harris?, E. R. Abigail, A. J. McLachlan & Co., later McLachlan, Westgarth & Co. Elizabeth Barnard was a daughter of racing official Simeon Barnard.
Similarity of their names led to ill-feeling between himself and Judah Moss Solomon BA LLB (1857–1925), who adopted the surname Solomon-Senior (see below).
Walter Samuel Solomon (14 August 1877 – 14 December 1955) married Alice Forshaw (c. 1881 – 18 September 1947); fought as Trooper in Boer War, convert from Judaism to Salvation Army; served as (Brigadier) chaplain in WWII at age 65. awarded Australian Efficiency Decoration in 1947.
Benjamin "Ben" Solomon (3 November 1844 – 18 September 1922) married Louisa Lee (31 December 1846 – 27 December 1933) on 27 February 1867. He was another AEI Old Scholar, SA Government auctioneer and land valuator. He rose from private to colonel in the SA Voluntary Militia, having started in the Adelaide Field Artillery under Colonel Torrens. He twice rescued someone from drowning at Glenelg, received Royal Humane Society award. Louisa was a daughter of Philip Lee ( – 21 January 1861), SA's first Jewish settler, arriving on Tam O'Shanter in November 1836.
Rachel Henrietta Solomon (1868 – 10 February 1940) married Harry Chalinder (c. 1862 – 18 March 1941)
Reginald Louis Solomon (1877 – 18 June 1939) married Florence Nellie "Nell" in 1929. He was publisher of (Adelaide) Truth, convicted of publishing an "obscene libel" 1907. The article in question was entitled "Darkest Adelaide" and concerned an unnamed premises. He was later an auctioneer with his father, and may have been the publisher of a weekly racing tips booklet.
Elizabeth Solomon (22 October 1846 – ) born in Sydney
Samuel Solomon (15 January 1848 – ) AEI student in 1863
Leah Solomon (16 June 1851 –  )
Vaiben Louis Solomon MHA MHR (13 May 1853 – 20 October 1908) was (for seven days) the 21st Premier of South Australia and a member of the first Commonwealth parliament. An AEI student, he married the widow Mary Ann Bridgland (née Wigzell) (c. June 1856 – 7 January 1885) on 6 December 1880 at Darwin (Vaiben had been earlier prohibited by his father from marrying Mary, a daughter of William Danks Wigzell) and mother of Walter Lewis Bridgland (1908–1987). They had one daughter, Mary Danks Solomon; Mary Ann died giving birth to their second. He married again, to Alice Cohen ( – 19 May 1954) of Richmond Victoria on 22 July 1896.
Mary Danks Solomon (10 September 1881 – 1 June 1952) married financier D(avid) Leon Abraham ( – 24 April 1944) on 16 September 1903. She received the Royal Humane Society's medal in 1894
Vaiben Louis "Vaib" Solomon (31 May 1897 – ) married Claribelle Mitchell ( – ) on 31 March 1931. He was a writer, noted for the musical version of Tons of Money for Hugh J. Ward.
Esther "Ess" Solomon MBE (6 April 1900 – 27 January 1991) married three times: to dentist Hyam John "Boy" Lipman (11 January 1889 – 16 March 1960) on 9 April 1919; Harrold Cook; and  Sir Roland Ellis "Raoul" Jacobs (28 February 1891 – 28 June 1981) on 30 November 1970.  Esther was the first woman elected to the Adelaide City Council and served two terms as Deputy Mayor. They had three children: Alice Sylvia Lipman (1920– ), Gerald John Lipman (1921–1928) and Dr Rex John Lipman, AO ED (26 April 1922 – 4 July 2015)
Selena Sara "Lena" Solomon (29 March 1859 – 18 September 1939) married Henry Louis Harris MB. ( – 4 April 1927) on 30 March 1881, lived "Salve" Tamworth, New South Wales
Isabella Solomon (17 September 1820 – 1 December 1863) married "uncle" Isaac Solomon (1816/1818–1901), perhaps in 1842.
Julia Sarah Solomon (1828–1867) married Henry Keesing jun. of Auckland N.Z. on 14 June 1848
Rosetta Solomon (1829 – 23 April 1881) married John Daniels (c. 1817 – 17 October 1887) on 8 February 1854. He was prominent in the voluntary militia
Leah Solomon (15 January 1830 – 9 August 1908) married Morris Lyon Marks MHA on 30 January 1850.
Samuel Moss Solomon (1835 – 27 June 1921? 16 July 1921?) married Leah Cohen (1833 – 19 March 1913) on 9 June 1859.
(Charles) Phillip Solomon (1836 – 29 September 1920) married cousin Julia Benjamin (17 February 1836 – 12 February 1921) on 20 February 1867, lived Merton Street, Albert Park, Victoria.
Kate Solomon (19 June 1837 – 7 June 1928) married Maurice Salom MLC (1 July 1831 – 10 October 1903) on 27 August 1856 home "Brougham", Brougham Place, North Adelaide
Elias Solomon MLA, MHR (2 September 1839 – 23 May 1909) an AEI student in 1855, married Agnes Elizabeth Bickley (c. 1846 – 22 April 1886) then Elizabeth Stokes (16 September 1868 – 3 December 1898) on 1 May 1887. He lived in Fremantle, Western Australia.

Susan
Susan Solomon (1799 – 14 June 1885) married Moses (or Moss) Benjamin (c. 1797 – 24 April 1876), lived in Tavistock Street, Adelaide from 1869 to 1876 at least. Susan died at the home of son-in-law Isaac Asher, North Adelaide. Their family included:
Fanny Benjamin (11 December 1822 – 24 March 1913) married brother-in-law Samuel Cohen (c. 1822 – 11 June 1865) (see below) on 28 July 1852; they lived in Gawler; he was sued for not supporting illegitimate child, died in New Zealand. On 13 April 1869, she married again, to widower Samuel Hyam Isaacs. She had no children by either marriage. Samuel Isaacs had two by a previous marriage:
Leah Isaacs (c. 1852 – 18 August 1916) married "cousin" Saul Solomon (20 June 1848 – 7 July 1909) on 19 June 1877, a double wedding. Saul was a prominent member of the Stock Exchange. For their children, see his entry below.
Eve Isaacs (c. 1854 – 22 September 1924) married "cousin" Judah Moss Solomon (18 September 1846 – 30 July 1911) on 30 October 1872. For their children see his entry below.
Elizabeth Benjamin (c. 1828 – 17 April 1902) married Isaac Asher (24 September 1832 – 16 April 1908) on 6 January 1864.
Julia Benjamin (17 February 1836 – 12 February 1921) married (cousin) (Charles) Phillip Solomon (1836 – 29 September 1920) on 20 February 1867
Sarah Benjamin (1838–) born in England, married brother-in-law Emanuel Cohen (c. 1835 – 17 November 1895)  on 11 December 1858. For their family see his entry below.
Anna Benjamin (c. 1842 – 24 October 1894) married cousin Moss Judah Solomon (15 June 1843 – 11 February 1933)  on 13 September 1865. For their children, see his entry above.
Philip Benjamin (1848 – September 1924) married Miriam "Minnie" Cohen (26 February 1852 – 17 April 1918) on 10 January 1882. She was a sister of Hon. Justice Henry Emanuel Cohen and Fanny, Lady Benjamin. Their three children include:
Sophia "Zoe" Benjamin (24 December 1882 – 13 April 1962) childhood educator.
Captain Alva Benjamin M.B., Ch.M. (Sydney), F.F.Hom. (1884–1975) surgeon with Royal Army Medical Corps in WWI, later homeopathic skin specialist.

Emanuel
Emanuel Solomon MLC (1800 – 3 October 1873) married fellow convict Mary Ann Wilson on 6 November 1826. On 12 April 1844 he married Cecilia "Celia" Adelaide Smith ( – 24 July 1852) who died in Sydney; that same year he married a third time, to Catherine Abrahams (1819 – 2 July 1901). Their children included:
Elizabeth Dorsetta Solomon (c. 1839 – 16 February 1914) married "cousin" Samuel Israel Myers (8 April 1833 – 4 January 1901) on 24 November 1858. For their children see his entry below 
Rosetta Solomon (c. 1842 – 24 December 1901) married Joel Moss ( – ) on 5 July 1865, lived at "Westwood", Glebe Point, New South Wales. He was named an executor of Emanuel Solomon's Will.
Julia Solomon (c. 1844 – 3 February 1881) married Victor Voules Brown (1841 – 18 February 1910) on 24 January 1864. Brown's Mart (originally Solomon's Mart) in Darwin, now a theatre, was named for him. John Alexander Voules Brown (1852–1945) was a brother.
Joseph Samuel Solomon (1846 – 4 September 1940) married Miriam Solomon (30 October 1850 – 6 December 1921), eldest daughter of the (unrelated) Abraham Jacob Solomon (c. 1825–1889), on 25 November 1868. They lived at Walkerville Terrace, Walkerville. He was partner in firm of Solomon Cousins (aka Nimble Ninepence) of King William Street and Kapunda with "nephew" Moss Judah Solomon (1843–1933).
Catherine Leah Solomon (c. 1848 – 4 July 1897) married Louis Victorsen of Clare on 27 May 1874 at the residence of J. S. Solomon, Buxton St, North Adelaide.
Vaiben or (more commonly) Vabien Joel Solomon (27 November 1854 – 27 January 1936) married Johanne Dorethea Auguste Catharina Solomon "Dora" Muhr (c. 1858 – 2 June 1946) on 25 July 1877. He was commission agent, pawnbroker of Adelaide. Jailed for 6 months 1889 for misappropriation of share certificates, and found insolvent on three separate occasions.
Judah Moss Solomon, from 1896 known as Judah Moss Solomon-Senior (8 October 1857 – 27 February 1925) married Henrietta Hannah Victorsen (1861 – 28 March 1902). He married again on 20 December 1905 to "niece" (Hannah) Annie Solomon (c. 1875 – 22 December 1942), daughter of Judah Moss Solomon (1846–1911) of Buxton Street, North Adelaide. He was solicitor of Widows Fund Building, Grenfell Street, noted for City of Adelaide Land and Investment Company v. Thomas Bent (later Premier of Victoria), and the Campbell Compensation Case. Enmity arose between him and namesake, J(udah) Moss Solomon BA LLB (12 April 1869 – 30 March 1949), leading to him changing his name to Solomon-Senior. He was struck off the rolls for misappropriation of money held in trust for client Mary Hammond née Scott. His namesake was struck off the rolls around the same time for much smaller defalcations.
Ethel Solomon, later Solomon-Senior (1881– ) married cousin (Isaac) Herbert Solomon (1876–1947) on 19 July 1905

Hannah
Hannah Solomon (1801– )  married Benjamin Samuel Cohen (1791–1858); they never left England. She has been reported as emigrating to Sydney with her father in April 1833. Their children include:
Rachel Cohen (1819 – 9 January 1864) married cousin Judah Moss Solomon  (21 December 1818 – 29 August 1880) on 7 August 1842. See his entry above
Samuel Cohen (1822 – 11 June 1865) married cousin Fanny Benjamin (11 December 1822 – 24 March 1913) on 28 July 1852; they lived in Gawler. He was sued for not supporting illegitimate child, died in Christchurch, New Zealand         
Emanuel Cohen (1835 – 17 November 1895) married cousin Sarah Benjamin (23 January 1839 – 16 June 1920) (see above) on 11 December 1858; lived in Adelaide; she died in Bondi. They had at least five sons and two daughters. Son Lawrence Cohen (24 December 1868 – 1916) married Catherine "Kate" Cohen on 18 May 1862

Vaiben
Vaiben Solomon (1798? 1802? – 21 June 1860) was transported for larceny to Sydney 1818, married Mary "Sarah" Smith (c. 1809 – 18 May 1879) in 1826.  Vaiben and his family are listed in the subscriptions to the building of Sydney's first Synagogue (see the Circular to the Members of the Faith of Israel, 1839, in which Vaiben Solomon is listed on the committee for the building of a New Synagogue, built in 1844 in York Street).  Among their children were:
Elizabeth Solomon (1833 – 4 October 1922) was buried at the Jewish Cemetery, Rookwood. She left her entire estate valued at £31,798 to her sister Hannah.
Ernest George Vaiben Solomon (19 October 1872 – 8 August 1928) married Elizabeth Amelia "Lizzie" Wood (c. 1874 – 4 March 1898) on 16 June 1896. He married again, around 25 April 1900, to Clara E. J. Hayes ( – ), who was involved in the Mrs Alexander will case. He was a publican of Gladestone Hotel, Hunter's Hill; Moore Park View Hotel; Park View Hotel, Sydney; Bridge Hotel, Sydney; Hotel Clovelly.
Edwin Arthur Vaiben Solomon (20 September 1877 – ), cabinetmaker, married Jessie Elizabeth Black (1874 – 13 May 1951) on 4 March 1907, lived Liverpool NSW, contested his aunt Hannah's will on the grounds of her insanity.
Lance Vaiben Solomon (27 January 1913 – 1989) married Beryl Naismith. He was a noted painter
Hannah Alexandra Solomon (c. 1840 – 7 October 1929) married Louis Alexander (c. 1869 – ) on 24 December 1895, divorced in 1907. Note disparity in ages. Wealthy eccentric, her £80,000 will was contested by nephew Edwin Solomon and widely reported.
Charles Vaiben Solomon (1842 – 8 July 1915) has been confused with the unrelated Charles Solomon (1832 – 15 November 1915) of Cooma.
Vaiben and sons David V. Solomon (1828–1909), Abraham V. Solomon (1832–1894) and Saul V. Solomon (1834–1911) were from before 1856 in partnership as V. Solomon and Sons, graziers at Horningsea Park, near Liverpool. Vaiben withdrew from the partnership in April 1857. His sons continued as D., A. & S. Solomon; they left the district in 1872. During his life Vaiben accumulated a considerable portfolio of properties.

Philip
Philip Solomon (1806 – September 1876) about whom little is known. It is likely he married and was father of Selina Sarah Solomon (7 September 1850 – 26 November 1891), later Phillips

Sarah
Sarah Solomon (c. 1808 – 14 March 1893) married Michael Joshua (1806 – 9 January 1887). They arrived in Sydney in December 1839. He was a dealer of Hindley Street, lived in Brighton, South Australia at least 1845–1853, later Melbourne, died in Cooktown, Queensland. They had four daughters and two sons. 
Sir Louis Edward Barnett CMG (1865–1946), professor of surgery in New Zealand, was a grandson.

Esther
Esther Solomon (1809 – 4 December 1869) married Israel Myers (c. 1806 – 17 August 1894). She may have arrived in Hobart in January 1833. Their children include:
Samuel Israel Myers (8 April 1833 – 4 January 1901) married "cousin" Elizabeth Dorsetta Solomon (c. 1839 – 16 February 1914) on 24 November 1858, lived at "Westwood", Glebe Point, New South Wales, later Ashfield. Of their many children, most were married by Unitarian ministers or in a civil ceremony.
David Moss Myers BA (10 May 1845 – 19 July 1928), solicitor of Roseville, married Deborah Asher (26 August 1848 – 14 August 1929) on 26 October 1870. He was a candidate for the seat of Eden-Bombala in 1894
Julia Myers (1847 – 1 February 1923) married Antoine Blitz (c. 1833 – 25 July 1905) on 12 October 1870. She was matron of the Sir Moses Montefiore Home, as "J.B." a contributor to The Queenslander and author of Old Stanley's Will, Heilbronn (1884), After a Hundred Years, Digger Dick's Darling and other tales (1888) and An Australian Millionaire (1894)

Isaac
Isaac Solomon (5 April 1816? 1818? – 27 July 1901) arrived in Sydney in 1833, married Isabella Solomon (17 September 1820 – 1 December 1863), daughter of his half-brother Moss Samuel Solomon, at the Bridge Street Synagogue, Sydney, on 15 June 1842. Later had home "Elizabeth Villa" on Kent Terrace, Norwood, South Australia. He had an import business in Adelaide in partnership (dissolved December 1857) with nephew Judah Moss Solomon (1818–1880) at the London end.
Samuel Isaac Solomon (4 June 1843 – 9 October 1907) married Sarah Pulver (c. 1848 – 27 June 1882) on 18 October 1876, had two children by Maud Rachel Marks, but no record of marriage has been found. He married again, to Gertrude Rose "Maude" Maxted (16 June 1864 – 23 November 1901) on 29 December 1892. His children were:
Adela Isabel Solomon (9 January 1878 – 29 March 1865) married cousin Isaac Herbert Boas (20 October 1878 – ) on 1 January 1908.
Harold Isaac Solomon (1 March 1880 – 3 May 1965) married (unrelated) Miriam Sarah "Minnie" Solomon (5 April 1879 – ) on 6 January 1909.
Judah Moss Solomon (18 September 1846 – 30 July 1911) attended St Peters College in 1861, AEI in 1862, married "cousin" Eve Isaacs (c. 1854 – 22 September 1924) on 30 October 1872; the first marriage ceremony in the new synagogue. He died at his home on Buxton Street, North Adelaide. The family lived at Barton Terrace east, North Adelaide.
Isabella Solomon (1873 – 12 June 1937) married Alexander "Alick" J. Isaacs of St Kilda, Victoria on 4 July 1906
(Hannah) Annie Solomon (c. 1875 – 22 December 1942) married "uncle" Judah Moss Solomon-Senior (c. 1857–1925) on 20 December 1905
(Isaac) Herbert Solomon BA LLB (1876 – 27 October 1947) married "cousin" Ethel Solomon-Senior ( – ) on 19 July 1905
Florence May Solomon ( – ) married Conrad Constantine Eitel (c. August 1880 – May 1947) on 26 December 1901. Conrad, a son of naturalised German Rev. Dr. Ernest John Eitel (c. 1838 – 10 November 1908) and his wife Mary Anne Winifred née Eaton (c. 1838 in Norton, Worcestershire –  26 February 1923), was born in Hong Kong and was the journalist who succeeded C. J. Dennis as editor of The Critic. In August 1911 he was appointed Secretary for Douglas Mawson's Antarctic Expedition, then volunteered for service two days after Australia's declaration of war 1914. He was sent on an Expeditionary Force (a six month contract) to Rabaul on 19 August 1914. On return to Australia he applied for a commission, but was barred from service on account of his German parentage. He changed his name to Lionel Lambert Eaton and enlisted again in August 1915. He was a model soldier but discharged in February 1916 on the grounds of giving a false answer in his application. later known as Lionel Lambert Eitel (1872 – 26 July 1947). His wife has been recorded as Florence Maud Eitel.
Gertrude "Gertie" Solomon (1879–) married Jonas Lipman on 19 February 1917. Lipman was an early pioneer of theatre and film, and spent much of his time in Hollywood and London. Due to this level of global travel, unusual at the time, some sources list them as not having returned from the US to Australia. Lipman was instrumental in the foundation of several productions houses, was the producer of the first ever on location film, Mystery Island and is reported to have, for a time, owned the rights to Charlie Chaplin films, everywhere in the world except America. Articles show him as having paid £1,000,000.00 for these rights, an extraordinary amount in contemporary terms. Lipman produced and directed, amongst others, Just Peggy, and also performed under the name Rigby C. Tearle. Part of the set of early Hollywood, their friends included Houdini, Chaplin, Douglas Fairbanks and Mary Pickford. Gertrude and Jo lived in Sydney with two children, Judith Sylvia (29 January 1919-) and Robert.
Saul Solomon (20 June 1848 – 7 July 1909) married "cousin" Leah Isaacs (23 May 1852 – 18 August 1916) on 19 June 1877, a double wedding. Saul was a prominent member of the Adelaide Stock Exchange. They had six daughters and one son:
(Isaac) Edgar Solomon (1880 – 31 October 1945) was a successful racehorse owner and breeder.
Elizabeth Solomon (1851 – 26 September 1916) married Rev. Abraham Tobias Boas (25 November 1842 – 20 February 1923) on 15 May 1873 
Lionel Tobias Boas (1875 – 16 August 1949) was mayor of Subiaco, founder of Young Australia League in Western Australia
Isaac Herbert Boas (20 October 1878 – 15 October 1955) married cousin Adela Isabel Solomon (9 January 1878 – 29 March 1965) on 1 January 1908. Adela was a daughter of Samuel Isaac Solomon (1843–1907)
Albert Victor Boas (1887 – December 1967) was dentist of Port Pirie
Harold Boas (1883–1980) prominent town planner
Esther Solomon (17 April 1852 – 27 September 1930) married cousin Joseph Michael Cashmore (7 November 1843 – 16 April 1931) on 19 June 1877, a double wedding.
Emanuel Solomon (7 October 1855 – 12 May 1938) AEI student, married cousin Rebecca Cashmore (25 September 1853 – 15 February 1918) of Hotham, Victoria on 7 June 1882.
Julia Solomon (14 December 1858 – 1951) married Josiah Marks (c. 1840 – 22 November 1902) on 6 March 1878; their home was "Exeter", 9 St. Vincent place, Albert Park, Victoria.

Elizabeth
Elizabeth "Betsy" Solomon (14 June 1821 – 9 February 1898) married Michael Cashmore (7 March 1815 – 17 October 1886) in Sydney on 9 December 1840, survived wreck of the steamship PS Clonmel on 2 January 1841, to become the first Jewish settlers of Victoria. They lived at "Cashmore's Corner", 1 Elizabeth Street then Albert Park, Victoria. His sisters Esther Cashmore and Leah Cashmore married Crawcour boys, eldest Susan Cashmore married a Benjamin.
Alice Cashmore (11 May 1842 – ) married Henry Isaacs on 23 March 1859, lived Castlemaine, then Yarra then London. Henry and brother George were wine merchants at Castlemaine in gold rush days.
Joseph Michael Cashmore (7 November 1843 – 16 April 1931) married cousin Esther Solomon (17 April 1852 – 27 September 1930) on 19 June 1877; a double wedding.
Esther Cashmore (14 June 1845 – 7 December 1920) married Henry Cohen (13 November 1840 – 6 March 1918) of New Zealand on 5 February 1868
Samuel Herbert Cashmore (1847 – 9 July 1931) married Deborah Alice Morrell ( – 17 October 1951) on 20 January 1880. He famously operated as a bookmaker though blind from an early age; his clerk was deaf and dumb.
Isaac Michael Cashmore (1849 – 16 April 1890) married Louisa Perrett ( – 16 November 1940) c. 1882, lived Fitzroy, Victoria
Henry Cashmore (25 February 1851 – 5 October 1875) 
Rebecca Cashmore (25 September 1853 – 15 February 1918) married cousin Emanuel Solomon (7 October 1855 – 12 May 1938) on 7 June 1882.
Alfred Cashmore (7 August 1855 – 18 March 1885)
Sarah Cashmore (July 1857 – 1954)
Louisa Cashmore (1860 – 28 September 1936) married Julius Magnus (21 December 1858 – 26 February 1944) on 4 February 1885, lived St. Kilda, then Caulfield.

Bibliography
Jenny Cowan, (2016) Meet our Ancestors — Solomon and Associated Families: Volume 1 not as yet accessed

References 

History of South Australia
South Australian families
Australian Jews
Jewish families
1760s births
1842 deaths